Safe is an unincorporated community in southeastern Maries County, in the U.S. state of Missouri. The community is located on Missouri Route H on a hill just west of and above the Bourbeuse River. The community is approximately six miles north-northeast of St. James.

History
A post office called Safe was established in 1886, and remained in operation until 1958. According to one tradition, the community was named for the generosity of the proprietor of a local gristmill who allowed safekeeping of customer's grain. Another tradition maintains the name is an acronym of the surnames of four first settlers, namely Shinkle, Aufderheide, Fann, and Essman.

References

Unincorporated communities in Maries County, Missouri
Unincorporated communities in Missouri